Épinay-sur-Seine is one of the two railway stations in the commune of Épinay-sur-Seine, Seine-Saint-Denis department, France (the other being the Gare d'Épinay-Villetaneuse). The station opened in 1908 on what was then called the Les Grésillons line, which in 1988 was incorporated into the North Branch of the RER C as part of the Vallée de Montmorency - Les Invalides connection project.

The station

The station was built by the Nord company in 1908 as part of the opening of the Les Grésillons line (also known as the Docks line). It was designed by Clément Ligny in a regional style which combines decorative elements such as Montmorency marl, glazed brick, cut stone, ceramic friezes, and wrought iron.

The unusual vertical arrangement of the station is due to its formerly having been a transfer point to the Grande Ceinture line, which had a stop there called the Grand Sentier. The Grande Ceinture crosses over the RER line passing next to one gable of the station.

The station is served by trains on Branch C1 of the RER C.

The station is set to become a significant interchange. In 2014, a stop on Île-de-France tramway Line 8 opened. In the future, the station is to be served also by the Tram Express Nord, on the former Grande Ceinture line.

In 2004, the number of passengers per day was between 2,500 and 7,500.

References

External links

 

Buildings and structures in Seine-Saint-Denis
Réseau Express Régional stations
Railway stations in France opened in 1908
Railway stations in Seine-Saint-Denis